In peace time these Luftwaffe detachments were based in Germany, Austria, Bohemia, Moravia, and Slovakia ; but they were moved to advanced bases on the outbreak of hostilities with Poland, the "Fall Weiss" Operation, on September 1, 1939.

Luftwaffe Lehrdivision (Development and Operational Training Division)

Tactical Reconnaissance
9.(H)/LG.2 (Jüterbog-Damm)

Strategic Reconnaissance
7.(F)/LG.2 (Jüterbog-Damm)
8.(F)/LG.2 (Jüterbog-Damm)

Fighters
Stab/LG.2 (Jüterbog-Damm)
1.(J)/LG.2 (Garz)
11.(N)/LG.2 (Garz)

Zerstörer (Heavy Fighters)
I.(Z)/LG.1 (Barth)

Bombers
Stab/LG.1 (Greifswald)
I.(K)/LG.1 (Neubrandenburg)
II.(K)/LG.1 (Schwerin)
III.(K)/LG.1 (Greifswald)
10.(See)/LG.1 (Travermunde)

Dive bombers
IV.(St.)/LG.1 (Barth)

Luftflotte 1 (Air Fleet 1) Nordostdeutschland (Northeast Germany)

Tactical (Army) Reconnaissance (Heeres-Aufklärungsgruppen)
1.(H)/10 (Neuhausen)
2.(H)/10 (Neuhausen)
1.(H)/11 (Großenhain)
1.(H)/21 (Stargard)
2.(H)/21 (Stargard)
3.(H)/21 (Stargard)
4.(H)/21 (Stargard)
1.(H)/41 (Reichenberg)
2.(H)/41 (Reichenberg)

Strategical Reconnaissance (Fern-Aufklärungsgruppen)
3.(F)/10 (Neuhausen)
2.(F)/11 (Großenhain)
3.(F)/11 (Großenhain)
4.(F)/11 (Großenhain)
1.(F)/120 (Neuhausen)
1.(F)/121 (Prenzlau)
2.(F)/121 (Prenzlau)
3.(F)/121 (Prenzlau)
4.(F)/121 (Prenzlau)

Fighters
I./JG.1 (Seerappen)
I./JG.21 (Jesau)
I./JG.2 (Doberitz)
10.(N)/JG.2 (Fürstenwalde)
1./JG.20 (Fürstenwalde)
2./JG.20 (Fürstenwalde)
Stab/JG.3 (Bernburg)
I./JG.3 (Zerbst)

Zerstörer (Heavy Fighters)
I./ZG.1 (Jüterbog-Damm)
II./ZG.1(JGr.101) (Fürstenwalde)
I./ZG.2 (JGr.102) (Bernburg)

Bombers
Stab/KG.1 (Neubrandenburg)
I./KG.152(II./KG.1) (Neubrandenburg)
I./KG.1 (Kolberg)
Stab/KG.2 (Cottbus)
I./KG.2 (Liegnitz)
II./KG.2 (Liegnitz)
Stab./KG.3 (Elbing)
II./KG.3 (Heiligenbeil)
III./KG.3 (Heiligenbeil)
I./KG.25 (Rechlin)
Stab./KG.4 (Erfurt)
I./KG.4 (Gotha)
II./KG.4 (Erfurt)
III./KG.4 (Nordhausen)

Dive Bombers
Stab/St. G.1 (Insterburg)
I./St. G.2 (Cottbus)
II./St. G.2 (Stolp - Reitz)
III./St. G.2 (Langensalza)

Land Air Strike (Operative Training)
II.(Schl)/LG.2 (Tutow)

Luftflotte 2 (Air Fleet 2) Nordwestdeutschland (Northwest Germany)

Tactical Reconnaissance
 1. (H) / 12 (Münster Loddenheide-)
 2. (H) / 12 (Münster Loddenheide-)
 3. (H) / 12 (Münster Loddenheide-)
 4. (H) / 12 (Münster Loddenheide-)
 4. (H) / 22 (Kassel-Rothwesten)

Strategical Reconnaissance
1.(F)/22 (Kassel-Rothwesten)
2.(F)/22 (Kassel-Rothwesten)
3.(F)/22 (Kassel-Rothwesten)
1.(F)/122 (Goslar)
2.(F)/122 (Goslar)
3.(F)/122 (Goslar)

Fighters
I./JG.26 (Cologne-Ostheim)
II./JG.21 (Düsseldorf)
10.(N)/JG.2 (Düsseldorf)

Zerstörer (Heavy Fighters)
I./ZG.26 (Dortmund)
II./ZG.26 (Werl)
II./ZG.26 (Lippstadt)

Bombers
Stab/KG.26 (Lüneburg)
I./KG.26 (Lübeck-Blankensee)
II./KG.26 (Lüneburg)
Stab/KG.27 (Hannover-Langenhagen)
I./KG.27 (Hannover-Langenhagen)
II./KG.27 (Wunstorf)
III./KG.27 (Delmenhorst)
II./KG.28 (Gütersloh)

Luftflotte 3 (Air Fleet 3) Südwestdeutschland (Southwest Germany)

Tactical Reconnaissance
1.(H)/13 (Göppingen)
2.(H)/13 (Göppingen)
3.(H)/13 (Göppingen)
4.(H)/13 (Göppingen)
5.(H)/13 (Göppingen)
1.(H)/23 (Eschwege)
2.(H)/23 (Eschwege)
4.(H)/23 (Eschwege)

Strategical Reconnaissance
1.(F)/123 (Würzburg)
2.(F)/123 (Würzburg)
3.(F)/123 (Würzburg)

Fighters
I./JG.51 (Bad-Aibling)
I./JG.52 (Böblingen)
I./JG.53 (Wiesbaden-Erbenhein)
II./JG.53 (Mannheim-Sandhofen)
1./JG.70 (Nürnberg)
2./JG.70 (Nürnberg)
1./JG.71 (Friedrichshafen)
2./JG.71 (Friedrichshafen)
10.(N)/JG.72 (Mannheim-Sandhofen)
11.(N)/JG.72 (Stuttgart-Echterdingen)

Zerstörer (Heavy Fighters)
I./ZG.52 (JGr.52) (Illesheim)

Bombers
Stab/KG.51 (Landsberg)
I./KG.51 (Landsberg)
III./KG.51 (Memmingen)
Stab/KG.53 (Ansbach)
I./KG.53 (Ansbach)
II./KG.53 (Schwäbisch Hall)
III./KG.53 (Giebelstadt)
Stab./KG.54 (Fritzlar)
I./KG.54 (Fritzlar)
Stab/KG.55 (Gießen)
I./KG.55 (Langendiebach)
II./KG.55 (Gießen)

Dive Bombers
III./ST.G.51 (Wertheim am Main)

Luftflotte 4 (Air Fleet 4) Südostdeutschland (Southeast Germany, Austria, Bohemia, Moravia and Slovakia)

Tactical Reconnaissance
1.(H)/14 (Kottingbrunn)
2.(H)/14 (Kottingbrunn)
3.(H)/14 (Kottingbrunn)
1.(H)/31 (Brieg)
2.(H)/31 (Brieg)
4.(H)/31 (Brieg)

Strategical Reconnaissance
1.(F)/14 (Kottingbrunn)
2.(F)/31 (Brieg)
4.(F)/31 (Wiener Neustadt)

Fighters
I./JG.76 (Wien-Aspern)
I./JG.77 (Breslau)
II./JG.77 (Pilsen)

Zerstörer (Heavy Fighters)
I./ZG.76 (Olmutz)
II./ZG.76 (JGr.176) (Gablingen)

Bombers
Stab/KG.76 (Wiener Neustadt)
I./KG.76 (Wiener Neustadt)
III./KG.76 (Wels)
Stab/KG.77 (Prag-Kbely)
I./KG.77 (Prag-Kbely)
II./KG.77 (Brünn)
III./KG.77 (Olmutz)

Dive Bombers
Stab/St. G.77 (Breslau-Schöngarten, today Copernicus Airport Wrocław)
I./St. G.77 (Brieg)
II./St. G.77 (Breslau-Schöngarten)
I./St. G.76 (Graz)

Transport units
Stab/KGzbV. 1 (Fürstenwalde-Burg)
I./KGzbV.1 (Burg)
II./KGzbV.1 (Stendal)
III./KGzbV.1 (Berlin-Tempelhof)
IV./KGzbV.1 (Braunschweig)
Stab/KGzbV.2 (Neuruppin)
I./KGzbV.2 (Tutow)
II./KGzbV.2 (Faßberg)
III./KGzbV.2 (Lechfeld)
I./KGzbV.172 (Berlin-Tempelhof)
II./KGzbV.172 (Berlin-Tempelhof)
10./KGzbV.172 (Berlin-Tempelhof)
KGr.zbV.9(Heavy) (Berlin-Tempelhof)

Maritime Reconnaissance, Embarked and Sea regular units

North Sea sector

Coastal squadrons
Stab/KuFlGr.106 (Norderney)
1.(M)/KuFlGr.106 (Norderney)
2.(F)/KuFlGr.106 (Norderney)
3.(Mz)/KuFlGr.106 (Borkum)
1.(M)/KuFlGr.306 (Norderney)
Stab/KuFlGr.406 (List-Sylt)
1.(M)/KuFlGr.406 (List-Sylt)
2.(F)/KuFlGr.406 (List-Sylt)
3.(Mz)/KuFlGr406 (List-Sylt)

Squadron Embarked in vessel
1./BFlGr.196 (Wilhelmshaven)

Baltic Sea area

Coastal squadrons
Stab/KuFlGr.506(KGr.806) (Dievenow)
1.(M)/KuFlGr.506 (Dievenow)
2.(F)/KuFlGr.506 (Dievenow)
3.(Mz)/KuFlGr.506 (Dievenow)
Stab/KuFlGr.706 (Kamp bei Kolberg)
1.(M)/KuFlGr.706 (Kamp bei Kolberg)
3.(Mz)/KuFlGr.706 (Kamp bei Kolberg)
2.(F)/KuFlGr.606 (Kamp bei Kolberg)

Squadron Embarked in vessel
1./BFlGr.196 (Kiel-Holtenau)
4.(St)/TGr.186 (Kiel-Holtenau)
5.(J)/TGr.186 (Kiel-Holtenau)
6.(J)/TGr.186 (Kiel-Holtenau)

Military units and formations of the Luftwaffe